The 2014 Victorian Football League season is the 133rd season of the Victorian Football Association/Victorian Football League Australian rules football competition. The premiership was won by the Footscray Bulldogs, the reserves team of the Australian Football League's  which was competing in its first season in the VFL, after it defeated Box Hill by 22 points in the Grand Final on 21 September; it was the first senior VFL premiership won by the Footscray reserves team, and it was the tenth senior VFA/VFL premiership won by the Footscray/Western Bulldogs Football Club overall.

Association membership
The Association increased from fourteen teams to sixteen teams in 2014, following the end of two VFL-AFL affiliations:
AFL club  and VFL club Coburg ended their alignment, which had been in place since 2001. Richmond re-entered a stand-alone reserves team in the VFL, having previously fielded one in the 2000 season. Coburg continued as a stand-alone VFL club, and returned to using 'the Lions' as its mascot, having been known by Richmond's nickname of 'the Tigers' during the affiliation.
AFL club Western Bulldogs and VFL club Williamstown ended their alignment. The Bulldogs entered its stand-alone reserves team in the VFL for the first time, playing under the club's traditional name of Footscray. Williamstown continued as a stand-alone VFL club.

The Development League was reduced from ten teams to nine, with North Ballarat withdrawing its team; this left only the nine metropolitan VFL clubs competing in the seconds competition, with all five AFL clubs and both regional VFL clubs (North Ballarat and Bendigo) absent.

Foxtel Cup
The top two non-AFL teams from the 2013 VFL season – Box Hill and Williamstown – competed in the 2014 Foxtel Cup. Williamstown won the competition, defeating WAFL team West Perth in the Grand Final.

Premiership season
Features of the fixture included:
 A Good Friday game between previously aligned teams Bendigo Gold and Essendon.
 Two Anzac Day games with Frankston hosting Richmond and Bendigo hosting Footscray.
 Three matches in once-off regional Victorian locations: Echuca, Morwell and Swan Hill.

Source: VFL season 2014 Results and Fixtures
(*Note that only at some games are attendances recorded)

Round 1

Round 2

Round 3

Round 4

Round 5

Round 6

Round 7

Round 8

State Game

 Report

Round 9

Round 10

Round 11

Round 12

Round 13

Round 14

Round 15

Round 16

Round 17

Round 18

Round 19

Round 20

Ladder

Finals series

Qualifying and Elimination Finals

Semi-finals

Preliminary Finals

Grand final

Foxtel Cup

The two highest ranked non-AFL exclusive teams from the 2013 season (premiers Box Hill and third placed Williamstown) were invited to compete in the Foxtel Cup knockout competition for 2014. Box Hill was eliminated in the first round of the tournament, and Williamstown recorded comfortable victories in all three fixtures, earning a second Foxtel Cup title in club history.

Round 1

Semi-finals

Grand final

Awards
 The J. J. Liston Trophy was won by Alex Woodward, who polled 20 votes. Woodward finished ahead of Liam Anthony (North Ballarat), who finished second with 17 votes, and Tom Campbell (Footscray), who finished third with 15 votes.
 The Frosty Miller Medal was won jointly by Daniel Connors and Sam Grimley, who each kicked 38 goals during the home-and-away season; it was the fewest goals kicked to win the VFA/VFL goalkicking since 1900, when 's L. Daly won with 32 goals. Including finals, the leading goalkicker was Grimley, who finished with 45 goals to Connors' 40.
 The Fothergill-Round Medal was won by Nic Newman.
The Development League premiership was won by Williamstown. Williamstown 18.18 (126) defeated Box Hill 13.13 (91) in the Grand Final, played at North Port Oval on 13 September as a curtain-raiser to the seniors first preliminary final.

See also 
 List of VFA/VFL premiers
 Australian rules football
 Victorian Football League
 Australian Football League
 2014 AFL season

References

External links
AFL Victoria website
Official VFL website

Victorian Football League seasons
VFL